Hollywood Screen Test is an American talent show that aired on ABC from 1948 to 1953. This program holds the distinction as the first regularly broadcast television series by the American Broadcasting Company.

Format 
Debuting on April 15, 1948, and hosted first by Bert Lytell and then Neil Hamilton, Hollywood Screen Test sought to give exposure to many up-and-coming actors who were looking for their big break. The relatively unknown actors would be picked to guest star on the show, then they would have half-hour scenes of dialogue with established stage and screen actors.

Actors who appeared on Hollywood Screen Test included Grace Kelly, Jack Klugman, Pernell Roberts, Jack Lemmon, Michael Strong, Tommy Rettig, Susan Cabot, and Ralph Clanton.

Martha Wayne and Robert Quarry were assistants on the program. Ted Campbell was the announcer. Lester H. Lewis created the program. He and his wife, Juliette Lewis were the producers. Directors were Frederic Carr and Alton Alexander.

In 1951, participants on the program were selected via regional talent searches, such as a June 5, 1951, session in Detroit in which Jessica Landau, a Universal-International representative, chose a winner from 10 contestants. That was one of 11 searches over six weeks in a cooperative effort between Universal and the program.

Schedule
This program was the first network series telecast on ABC, which began regular broadcasting in April 1948.

Notes: All times Eastern. Source: The Complete Directory to Prime Time Network and Cable TV Shows, 1946-Present

Reception and lawsuit
Jack Gould, in a review of the February 2, 1953, episode in The New York Times, praised the show as "a program that in its own quiet way often does more real experimentation in drama than many of its more publicized counterparts." He complimented the presentation of "With Malice Toward None" as "creative TV, with a point of view and imagination and made for an absorbing thirty minutes".

In January 1949, Screen Test, Incorporated, sued ABC and the show's producers for $500,000, charging that their idea had been stolen. The plaintiffs had a Screen Test radio program and said that existence of Hollywood Screen Test had cost them an opportunity to sell their show. A Supreme Court justice in New York City refused to issue a permanent injunction against Hollywood Screen Test when he put the case on the court's docket.

Episodes
Six episodes are in the collection of the UCLA Film and Television Archive.

See also
1948-49 United States network television schedule
1949-50 United States network television schedule
1950-51 United States network television schedule
1951-52 United States network television schedule
1952-53 United States network television schedule

References

External links
 
Academy of American Television

1948 American television series debuts
1953 American television series endings
American Broadcasting Company original programming
Black-and-white American television shows
English-language television shows
Talent shows